The 1884–85 season was the 14th season of competitive football in England.

National team
England finished second in the British Home Championship, which was won by Scotland.

* England score given first

Key
 H = Home match
 BHC = British Home Championship

Note – Some sources credit England's third goal as a Joe Lofthouse goal, but match reports clearly state an Eames own goal.

Honours

Notes = Number in parentheses is the times that club has won that honour. * indicates new record for competition

External links

Report on England v Ireland match on thefa.com
Report on England v Wales match on thefa.com
Report on England v Scotland match on thefa.com
Report on England v Scotland match